Alex Seville (born 12 July 1998) is an English professional rugby union player who plays for Gloucester in the Premiership Rugby. He plays as a loosehead prop.

Alex studied at Hartpury College and joined Gloucester’s Senior Academy from the 2016-17 season. He became a member of the Hartpury College AASE when he was 16 and has represented Stroud District Schools, Bath & North-East Somerset and the Gloucestershire U16 side. He was part of Hartpury College on a dual-registered basis in the RFU Championship during the 2017-18 season.

In January 2017, he was named in the England U20 team for the 2017 Six Nations Under 20s Championship as an injury replacement. In January 2018, Seville was named in the England U20s squad for the 2018 World Rugby Under 20 Championship.

On 17 December 2018, Seville signed his first professional contract to stay with Gloucester, thus promoted to the senior squad for the 2019-20 season.

He joined Premiership Rugby club Northampton Saints on short-term loan until the end of September on 18 September 2020.

References

External links
Gloucester Rugby Profile
Hartpury College Profile
Ultimate Rugby Profile
ESPN Profile

1998 births
Living people
English rugby union players
Gloucester Rugby players
Rugby union players from Gloucester
Alumni of Hartpury College
Rugby union props